The Kinner K-5 was a popular engine for light general and sport aircraft developed by Winfield B. 'Bert' Kinner. With the boom in civilian aviation after Charles Lindbergh's transatlantic flight the K-5 sold well. The K-5 was a rough running but reliable engine and the K-5 and its derivatives were produced in the thousands, powering many World War II trainer aircraft. The K-5 was followed by the B-5, R-5 and R-55. Military engines were designated R-370

Applications
 Adcox Special
 American Eagle A-129 biplane
 Chamberlin C-2
 Davis D-1-K
 Fleet Model 2
 Granville Brothers Model A biplane
 Kinner Sportster
 Kreutzer Air Coach
 Simplex C-2 Red Arrow
 Sullivan Model K-3 Crested Harpy
 Waco KSO

Specifications (Kinner K-5)

References

Further reading

External links
 http://www.oldengine.org/members/diesel/Duxford/usaero4.htm

1930s aircraft piston engines
Aircraft air-cooled radial piston engines